The Trondheim Region is a statistical metropolitan region in the county of Trøndelag in Norway. It is centered in the city of Trondheim.

† Population data as of October 2012, from ssb;‡ Orkdal has been added to region due to new road completed

The new limited-access road to Orkdal, a part of European route E39, was completed on 30 June 2005, shortening the driving time between Trondheim and Orkanger with some 15 minutes, adding Orkdal to the region.

Although rarer, there is also some commuting from Rennebu, Levanger and Frosta.

See also 
Trondheim og omland
Trøndelag

References

External links 
 

Trøndelag
Metropolitan regions of Norway